Vice Admiral Shekhar Sinha, PVSM, AVSM, NM & Bar, ADC is a former Three star Admiral of the Indian Navy.

Military career
Sinha joined the Navy in 1974 in the Executive Branch of the Indian Navy. He was a Naval aviator. A Fighter pilot, he flew the Sea Harrier.

He commanded two Sea Harrier Squadrons as well as Air Station Hansa. Adm Sinha has commanded the first  INS Saryu, the  INS Shakti and the guided-missile destroyer INS Delhi.

Flag Rank
Ashore as a Flag Officer, he served as Flag Officer Naval Aviation, Assistant Chief of Naval Staff (Air) as well as Controller Personnel Services. 
As a Rear Admiral, Sinha served as the Flag Officer Commanding Western Fleet from 2007 to 2008.
In a short stint in 2011, he served as the 6th Chief of Integrated Defence Staff.
In 2012, Vice Adm Sinha was appointed Flag Officer Commanding-in-Chief Western Naval Command.

Supersession & Retirement
In 2014, the Government accepted the "voluntary retirement" of Vice Admiral Shekhar Sinha, who had put in his papers after Admiral Robin K. Dhowan, six months junior, superseded him to become the 22nd Chief of the Naval Staff. The Ministry of Defence's junking of the seniority principle has sparked some concern in military circles because successive governments have almost always stuck to it in appointing service chiefs. The chain of seniority in Indian military is considered virtually sacrosanct, with supersession being exceptionally rare.

The incumbent Chief of the Naval Staff, Admiral D K Joshi, resigned after a series of accidents involving ships of the Indian Navy. Adm Sinha was passed over as the Ministry of Defence felt that some of the blame for the mishaps should be attributed to him. After being passed over, Adm Sinha requested voluntary retirement.

Decorations and medals

References

Living people
Indian Navy admirals
Flag Officers Commanding Western Fleet
Naval War College alumni
1954 births
Recipients of the Param Vishisht Seva Medal
Recipients of the Ati Vishisht Seva Medal
Indian naval aviators
Recipients of the Nau Sena Medal